Holtfreter's solution (Holtfreter's medium) is a balanced salt solution that was developed by the developmental biologist Johannes Holtfreter for studying amphibian embryos and to reduce bacterial infections. As a specialised aqueous solution, it finds use in aquaria to prevent infections for early stage amphibians, where it is typically mixed with soft tap water. Amphibians such as axolotls prefer a hard water solution.

Composition
Molarity of the component salts are as follows:

Notes

 https://www.msu.edu/user/eisthen/lab/methods/animalcare/holtfr.html [link now dead]

References
 Armstrong, J.B., Duhon, S.T., and Malacinski, G.M. (1989) "Raising the axolotl in captivity". In J. B. Armstrong and G. M. Malacinski (eds.) Developmental Biology of the Axolotl. New York: Oxford University Press, pp. 220–227.

Solutions
Antimicrobials